Joe Barry (born July 5, 1970) is an American football coach who is the defensive coordinator for the Green Bay Packers of the National Football League (NFL). He previously served as the assistant head coach and linebackers coach for the Los Angeles Rams from 2017 to 2020 and defensive coordinator for the Washington Commanders from 2015 to 2016 and the Detroit Lions from 2007 to 2008. Barry also previously served as an assistant coach for the San Diego Chargers, Tampa Bay Buccaneers and San Francisco 49ers. Barry is the son of former coach Mike Barry.

Early years
Barry played linebacker at the University of Michigan from 1989 to 1990 before transferring to the University of Southern California.

Coaching career

Early career
In 1994, Barry began his coaching career at the University of Southern California (USC), his alma mater, as a graduate assistant. In 1996, Barry joined Northern Arizona University as their linebackers coach and would serve in that role from 1996 to 1998 before being hired in the same capacity at University of Nevada, Las Vegas (UNLV) in 1999.

San Francisco 49ers
In 2000, Barry was hired by the San Francisco 49ers as a defensive quality control coach under defensive coordinator Jim Mora and head coach Steve Mariucci.

Tampa Bay Buccaneers
In 2001, Barry was hired by the Tampa Bay Buccaneers as their linebackers coach under defensive coordinator Monte Kiffin and head coach Tony Dungy. In 2002, Barry, along with Kiffin, were retained by the new head coach of the Buccaneers Jon Gruden. That season, the Buccaneers went to Super Bowl XXXVII and defeated the Oakland Raiders to win their first Super Bowl title.

Detroit Lions
In 2007, Barry was hired by the Detroit Lions as their defensive coordinator under head coach Rod Marinelli, who is also Barry's father-in-law.

At a press conference on December 21, 2008, following the Lions' 42–7 loss to the New Orleans Saints, Detroit News sports columnist Rob Parker addressed a question about Barry to Rod Marinelli, inquiring whether Marinelli wished that his daughter had "married a better defensive coordinator." (Barry was the Lions' defensive coordinator at the time.) The question was criticized as unprofessional and inappropriate. The next day, Parker wrote that the comment was "an attempt at humor" and not a malicious attack. Parker has not written for the Detroit News since, and has not attended any press conferences since the incident, including the one Marinelli gave following his dismissal as head coach of the Lions. On January 6, 2009, the Detroit News announced that Parker had resigned from the newspaper the previous week. Following the firing of Marinelli, Barry was not retained by the Lions.

Tampa Bay Buccaneers (second stint)
In 2009, Barry returned and was re-hired by the Tampa Bay Buccaneers as their linebackers coach under defensive coordinator Jim Bates and head coach Raheem Morris.

Jacksonville Jaguars & USC
On January 26, 2010, Barry was hired by the Jacksonville Jaguars and signed a contract to be their linebackers coach. That same day, it was announced that the Jaguars released Barry from his contract so he can join the University of Southern California (USC) as their linebackers coach.

San Diego Chargers
In 2012, Barry was hired by the San Diego Chargers as their linebackers coach under defensive coordinator John Pagano and head coach Norv Turner. In 2013, Barry was retained by new Chargers head coach Mike McCoy.

Washington Commanders
In 2015, Barry was hired by the Washington Commanders as their defensive coordinator under head coach Jay Gruden. Following the 2016 season, Barry was fired.

Los Angeles Rams
On January 14, 2017, Barry was hired by the Los Angeles Rams as their assistant head coach and linebackers coach under head coach Sean McVay.

Green Bay Packers
On February 8, 2021, Barry was hired by the Green Bay Packers as their defensive coordinator under head coach Matt LaFleur, replacing Mike Pettine. In his first year coordinating the unit, he developed veteran linebacker De'Vondre Campbell, who was signed as a free-agent for a $2 million contract, to First-Team All-Pro honors. His unit finished as the NFL's 9th ranked defense by yards allowed, despite missing star pass-rusher Za'Darius Smith and star cornerback Jaire Alexander for most of the season. During Week 11, his unit shut out Seahawks quarterback Russell Wilson for the first time in his career.

In their Divisional Round playoff game against the San Francisco 49ers, Barry and the Packers defense intercepted 49ers quarterback Jimmy Garoppolo once, while sacking him four times, limiting him to 3 points through 55 minutes as the Packers led by 7. However, the Packers lost 13–10 after their special teams unit allowed a blocked punt to be returned for a game-tying touchdown with 4:41 to play, the Packers offense was unable to produce on the following drive and had to punt with 2 minutes remaining, and the defense was unable to come up with a final stop, as the Packers lost 13–10.

Personal life
Barry is married to his wife, Chris Marinelli Barry, and they have four children together: daughters Camryn and Lauren and sons Sam and Nick. Through his marriage with Chris, Barry is the son-in-law to NFL coach and Las Vegas Raiders defensive line coach Rod Marinelli.

References

External links
 Green Bay Packers bio
 Los Angeles Rams profile 
 USC Trojans profile

1970 births
Living people
 American football linebackers
USC Trojans football coaches
Michigan Wolverines football players
Tampa Bay Buccaneers coaches
Detroit Lions coaches
Los Angeles Rams coaches
San Diego Chargers coaches
Washington Commanders coaches
USC Trojans football players
National Football League defensive coordinators
San Francisco 49ers coaches 
Green Bay Packers coaches
Sportspeople from Boulder, Colorado 
People from Boulder, Colorado